Jared Lincoln Cotter (born June 17, 1981) is an American pop/R&B singer, songwriter and model.  He has hosted a number of TV shows, and he co-wrote the number 1 song "Down" by Jay Sean.

Biography
Born and raised on Long Island, Cotter grew up in a family of musicians. Cotter's great grandfather, James Reese Europe, was the first African American jazz player to perform at Carnegie Hall. Cotter's father, Robert Cotter, played in the late 1970s with Nile Rodgers and the late Bernard Edwards of the Big Apple Band, later known as Chic. Cotter listed as his influence artists such as Stevie Wonder, Marvin Gaye and Brian McKnight.

Cotter's recording career began when he was 15. He performed and released music as JL Cotter, and co-wrote songs such as "Make U Cry", "My Girl", "She Likes It" and the Notorious B.I.G inspired "Somebody's Gotta Go". He has worked with Joshua Thompson, Rob Fusari and Jeremy Skaller, and has also collaborated with other songwriters including Andre Deyo, Teron Beal and worked with producer and songwriter, Quincy Patrick.

Cotter has performed on BET's 106 & Park, and opened for platinum-selling artist Avant. He has also performed at BB King's in Times Square, Village Underground, Soul Café and SOB's. In 2005, he independently released "The Album Before the Album".

Personal life
Cotter began dating Canadian singer-songwriter Melanie Fiona in 2013. On March 14, 2016, their first child was born. On Valentine's Day 2018, the couple became engaged.  Originally they planned to marry on Amalfi Coast, Italy; but the COVID-19 pandemic forced them to postpone their wedding three times. The couple eloped on December 12, 2020 in Los Angeles.

American Idol
Cotter appeared on the sixth season of American Idol and reached the semi-final stage of the competition.  He sang Stevie Wonder's "Lately" for his audition.

American Idol performances

Post-Idol career

Television
Immediately after American Idol, in June 2007, Cotter joined as co-host for a daily show The Sauce on the television network Fuse TV. After The Sauce was cancelled in 2008, he hosted You Rock, Lets Roll, a dating game show, in the same time slot. He also hosted Fuse's No. 1 Countdown: Pop where he presented videos and conducted interviews. He has also worked for Fox TV’s Good Day New York as a weekly correspondent during later seasons of American Idol. He was the host of The Challenge, a New York metropolitan area high school student quiz show on MSG Varsity internet service. From 2014 to 2015 Cotter was the co-anchor for the syndicated The Daily Buzz program of Florida's Full Sail University.

Music
Before he appeared on Idol, Cotter released an album, "The Album Before the Album,"  independently as JL Cotter in 2005.  The album was re-released after he appeared on Idol. He released a single "Good Morning" in October 2008.

Cotter has written songs for other popular artists such as Carl Thomas, Joe, and in particular Jay Sean with whom he has considerable success.   He co-wrote a number of songs on Jay Sean's album All or Nothing, including the number one song, "Down", which was the seventh-best selling single of 2009, and for which he received an ASCAP award as a writer for one of the "Most Performed Songs" of the year. He signed a worldwide deal with EMI Music Publishing in 2009. He has been nominated for Best Male R&B Vocalist at the Underground Hip Hop Music Awards..

Cotter released a five-song EP You Me Forever on July 1, 2014.

Discography

Album

Extended plays

Singles

Charted songs with song-writing credits

As featured artist

References

1981 births
Living people
American Idol participants
Singers from New York (state)
People from Oceanside, New York
21st-century American male singers
21st-century American singers